Placodiscus caudatus is a species of plant in the family Sapindaceae. It is found in Cameroon, Central African Republic, and Gabon. Its natural habitat is subtropical or tropical moist lowland forests. It is threatened by habitat loss.

References

caudatus
Endangered plants
Taxonomy articles created by Polbot